In the 1979 Tour de France, the following 15 teams each sent 10 cyclists, for a total of 150:

The big favourite was Hinault; not only was he the defending champion, but the large number of time trials made the race especially suited for him. The only cyclist though to be able to seriously challenge Hinault was Zoetemelk, the runner-up of the previous edition.

Start list

By team

By rider

By nationality

References

1979 Tour de France
1979